Aculepeira talishia is an orb-weaving spider species found in Turkey, Russia, Georgia and Azerbaijan.

See also 
 List of Araneidae species: A

References

External links 

Aculepeira
Spiders of Europe
Fauna of Azerbaijan
Spiders of Georgia (country)
Arthropods of Turkey
Spiders of Russia
Spiders described in 1902